Royal Park, in Melbourne.
Essendon and Moonee Ponds, Camp 1.
Bulla, Camp 3.
Lancefield, Camp 4.
Baynton, Camp 5.
Mia Mia, Camp 6.
Campaspe River, Camp 8.
Kerang, Camp 12.
Loddon River.
Swan Hill, Camp 15.
Murray River, Camp 16.
Kyalite, Camp 18.
Balranald, Camp 20.
Murrumbidgee River.
Pooncarie, Camp 30.
Darling River.
Kinchega National Park, Camp 34A.
Menindee, Camp 34B.
Mutawintji National Park, Camp 40.
Wilson River, Camp 57.
Cooper Creek, Camp 63.
Innamincka.
Diamantina River, Camp 74.
Birdsville, Queensland, Camp 76.
Bilpa Morea (Plant Camp?, 3 April 1861)
Burke River, Camp 89.
Boulia.
Selwyn Ranges, Camp 99.
Corella River, Camp 101.
Cloncurry River, Camp 110.
Flinders River, Camp 115.
Gulf of Carpentaria, Camp 119.

References

Burke and Wills